Herbert Hohenberger (born 8 February 1969) is an Austrian ice hockey player. He competed in the men's tournaments at the 1994 Winter Olympics and the 1998 Winter Olympics.

Career statistics

Regular season and playoffs

International

References

1969 births
Living people
Austrian ice hockey players
Olympic ice hockey players of Austria
Ice hockey players at the 1994 Winter Olympics
Ice hockey players at the 1998 Winter Olympics
Sportspeople from Villach
Augsburger Panther players
EC VSV players
HC TWK Innsbruck players
Hull Olympiques players
Kölner Haie players
Sherbrooke Canadiens players
Fredericton Canadiens players
Peoria Rivermen (IHL) players
Austrian expatriate ice hockey people
Austrian expatriate sportspeople in Canada
Austrian expatriate sportspeople in the United States